Pierre Hadot (21 February 1922 – 24 April 2010) was a French philosopher and historian of philosophy specializing in ancient philosophy, particularly Neoplatonism.

Life
In 1944, Hadot was ordained, but following Pope Pius XII’s encyclical Humani generis (1950) left the priesthood. He studied at the Sorbonne between 1946–1947. In 1961, he graduated from the École Pratique des Hautes Études. In 1964, he was appointed a Director of Studies at EPHE, initially occupying a chair in Latin Patristics, before his chair was renamed "Theologies and Mysticisms of Hellenistic Greece and the End of Antiquity" in 1972. He became professor at the Collège de France in 1983, where he assumed the chair of the History of Hellenistic and Roman Thought. In 1991, he retired from this position to become professeur honoraire at the collège; his last lecture was on 22 May that year. He concluded his final lecture by saying, "In the last analysis, we can scarcely talk about what is most important."

Over the course of his career, Hadot published translations of and commentaries on Porphyry, St. Ambrose, Plotinus, and Marcus Aurelius.

Hadot was married to the historian of philosophy, Ilsetraut Hadot.

Philosophical work
Hadot was one of the first authors to introduce Ludwig Wittgenstein's thought into France. Hadot suggested that one cannot separate the form of Wittgenstein's Philosophical Investigations from their content. Wittgenstein had claimed that philosophy was an illness of language and Hadot notes that the cure required a particular type of literary genre.

Hadot is also famous for his analysis of the conception of philosophy during Greco-Roman antiquity.  He identified and analyzed the "spiritual exercises" used in ancient philosophy (influencing the thought of Michel Foucault in the second and third volumes of his History of Sexuality). By "spiritual exercises" Hadot means "practices ... intended to effect a modification and a transformation in the subjects who practice them. The philosophy teacher's discourse could be presented in such a way that the disciple, as auditor, reader, or interlocutor, could make spiritual progress and transform himself within." Hadot shows that the key to understanding the original philosophical impulse is to be found  in Socrates. What characterizes Socratic therapy above all is the importance given to living contact between human beings.

Hadot's recurring theme is that philosophy in Antiquity was characterized by a series of spiritual exercises intended to transform the perception, and therefore the being, of those who practice it; that philosophy is best pursued in real conversation and not through written texts and lectures; and that philosophy, as it is taught in universities today, is for the most part a distortion of its original, therapeutic impulse. He brings these concerns together in What Is Ancient Philosophy?, which has been critically reviewed.

Publications

 with P. Henry, Marius Victorinus, Traités théologiques sur la Trinité, Cerf 1960 (Sources Chrétiennes nos. 68 & 69).
 Porphyre et Victorinus. Paris, Institut d'Etudes augustiniennes, 1968. (Collection des études augustiniennes. Série antiquité ; 32–33).
 Marius Victorinus: recherches sur sa vie et ses oeuvres, 1971. (Collection des études augustiniennes. Série antiquité ; 44).
 Exercices spirituels et philosophie antique. Paris, Etudes augustiniennes, 1981. (Collection des études augustiniennes. Série antiquité ; 88). .
 Philosophy as a Way of Life. Spiritual Exercises from Socrates to Foucault, edited with an Introduction by Arnold I. Davidson, translated by Michael Chase, Oxford/Cambridge, Massachusetts, Basil Blackwell, 1995, Oxford, Blackwell's, 1995. .
 La citadelle intérieure. Introduction aux Pensées de Marc Aurèle. Paris, Fayard, 1992. .
 The Inner Citadel: The Meditations of Marcus Aurelius, translated by Michael Chase, Cambridge, Massachusetts /London, Belknap Press of Harvard University Press, 1998.  
 Qu'est-ce que la philosophie antique? Paris, Gallimard, 1995. (Folio essais ; 280). .
What is Ancient Philosophy?, translated by Michael Chase, Cambridge, Massachusetts /London, Belknap Press of Harvard University Press, 2002. 
 Plotin ou la simplicité du regard (1963); 4e éd. Paris, Gallimard, 1997. (Folio esais ; 302). .
 Plotinus or the Simplicity of Vision, translated by Michael Chase, with an Introduction by Arnold A. Davidson, Chicago, University of Chicago Press, 1993. 
 Etudes de philosophie ancienne. Paris, Les Belles Lettres, 1998. (recueil d'articles).
 Marc Aurèle. Ecrits pour lui même, texte établi et traduit par Pierre Hadot, avec la collaboration de Concetta Luna. vol. 1 (general introduction and Book 1).  Paris, Collection Budé, 1998.  .
 Plotin, Porphyre: Études néoplatoniciennes. Paris, Les Belles Lettres, 1999. (recueil d'articles).
 La philosophie comme manière de vivre. Paris, Albin Michel, 2002. (Itinéraires du savoir). .
 The Present Alone is Our Happiness: Conversations with Jeannie Carlier and Arnold I. Davidson, 2nd ed. Translated by Marc Djaballah and Michael Chase, Stanford / Stanford University Press, 2011 (Cultural Memory in the Present). 
 Exercices spirituels et philosophie antique, nouvelle éd. Paris, Albin Michel, 2002. (Bibliothèque de l'évolution de l'humanité). .
 Le voile d'Isis: Essai sur l'histoire de l'idée de nature. Paris, Gallimard, 2004. (NRF essais). .
  The Veil of Isis: An Essay on the History of the Idea of Nature. , translated by Michael Chase, Cambridge, Massachusetts /London, Belknap Press of Harvard University Press, 2002. 
 Wittgenstein et les limites du langage. Paris, J. Vrin, 2004. (Bibliothèque d'histoire de la philosophie). .
 Apprendre à philosopher dans l'antiquité. L'enseignement du Manuel d'Epictète et son commentaire néoplatonicien (with Ilsetraut Hadot). Paris, LGF, 2004. (Le livre de poche ; 603). .
 N'oublie pas de vivre. Goethe et la tradition des exercices spirituels, Albin Michel, 2008. (Bibliothèque Idées). (ISBN 978-2-226-17905-0).
 Don't Forget to Live: Goethe and the Tradition of Spiritual Exercise, translated by Michael Chase with an foreword by Arnold A. Davidson and Daniele Lorenzini, Chicago, University of Chicago Press, 2023. ISBN 9780226497167

Notes

Further reading
J. Scheid, "Pierre Hadot (1922–2010), chaire de pensée hellénistique et romaine, 1982–1991", La lettre du Collège de France no. 30 December 2010, 43–45
G. Catapano, "Pierre Hadot (1922-2010)", Adamantius XVII (2011), 348–352
M. Chase, S.R.L. Clark, M. McGhee, eds., (2013). Philosophy as a way of life: ancients and moderns. Essays in honor of Pierre Hadot Wiley-Blackwell. .

External links
 
 Pierre Hadot (1922–2010) by Matthew Sharpe in the Internet Encyclopedia of Philosophy
 Review of What is Ancient Philosophy? by Benjamin Balint from First Things
 Michael Chase, Remembering Pierre Hadot – Part I & Part II

1922 births
2010 deaths
20th-century French educators
20th-century French essayists
20th-century French male writers
20th-century French historians
20th-century French philosophers
21st-century French educators
21st-century French essayists
21st-century French male writers
21st-century French philosophers
Academic staff of the Collège de France
Continental philosophers
Epistemologists
French historians of philosophy
French male essayists
French male non-fiction writers
French scholars of ancient Greek philosophy
Metaphilosophers
Metaphysicians
Ontologists
Philosophers of language
Philosophers of religion
Philosophy of life
Philosophy academics
Philosophy writers
Wittgensteinian philosophers